Khashtuk is a rural locality (an aul) in Afipsipskoye Rural Settlement of Takhtamukaysky District, the Republic of Adygea, Russia. The population was 269 as of 2018. There are 8 streets.

Geography 
The aul is on the left bank of the Kuban River, 35 km northwest of Takhtamukay (the district's administrative centre) by road. Yelizavetinskaya is the nearest rural locality.

Ethnicity 
The aul is inhabited by Circassians.

References 

Rural localities in Takhtamukaysky District